Mohamed Hamisi Missanga (born 15 March 1945) is a Tanzanian CCM politician and Member of Parliament for Singida South constituency since 2010.

References

1945 births
Living people
Chama Cha Mapinduzi MPs
Tanzanian MPs 2000–2005
Tanzanian MPs 2005–2010
Tanzanian MPs 2010–2015
Karimjee Secondary School alumni